CGS Kestrel was employed as a Government of Canada Fisheries Protection vessel on the Pacific Coast. Completed in 1899 by Alfred Wallace shipyards in Vancouver, British Columbia she entered into service in 1903 and remained in government service after the creation of the Royal Canadian Navy in 1910 until she was sold in 1912.  The vessel was broken up in 1931.

Description
Her design was influenced by the  class of fisheries protection cruisers, but Kestrels hull was built of wood.

Service history
Kestrel was constructed by Alfred Wallace shipyard in Vancouver, British Columbia with the yard number 14. The vessel was completed in February 1903. Used by the Canadian government as a fisheries patrol vessel on the Pacific Coast of Canada and registered in Ottawa, Ontario, Kestrel was in service from 1903 to 1912. The vessel was sold in 1912 to Charles N. & F. P. Armstrong, with the ship's name and registry remaining the same. Kestrel was sold again in 1918 to Fanning Island Ltd., keeping her name and registry. The vessel was broken up in the third quarter of 1931.

References

Notes

Citations

Sources
 
 

Patrol vessels of the Canadian Coast Guard
1903 ships
Fishery protection vessels
Ships built in British Columbia
Auxiliary ships of the Royal Canadian Navy
Canadian Government Ship